The islands of Shanghai are those under the jurisdiction of the Shanghai municipal government. They comprise three large inhabited islands and a shifting number of smaller, uninhabited ones. Most are alluvial islands in the Yangtze River Delta in China, although a number of islands in Hangzhou Bay off Jinshan District are also administered by Shanghai. The alluvial islands are relatively young and their number varies over time.

The Yangshan area of the Port of Shanghai is also located on two islands, Greater and Lesser Yangshan in Hangzhou Bay, but these are administered as part of Zhejiang's Shengsi County.

Chongming County

All three inhabited islands of Shanghai are alluvial islands in the Yangtze estuary between the Municipality of Shanghai and Jiangsu Province. They are administered as Chongming County, with its seat at Chengqiao on Chongming Island. The county was added to Shanghai from Jiangsu in 1958 and remains mostly rural: In 2008, its registered population of  included  farmers.

Chongming Island is now the second-largest island of mainland China (after Hainan). The natural expansion of the island has been greatly accelerated by reclamation projects, which doubled its size between 1950 and 2010. This growth caused it to absorb the former island of Yonglongsha, creating a long pene-exclave of Jiangsu on its northern shore administered as the townships of Haiyong and Qilong. The island was connected to Changxing by the Yangtze Bridge in 2009 and to Qidong in Jiangsu by the Chongqi Bridge in 2011. The Chonghai Bridge, to Haimen in Jiangsu, remains under construction and plans for Shanghai's S7 (Huchong) Expressway call for the creation of a bridge directly from Baoshan District to Chengqiao.

Changxing Island lies between Chongming and Shanghai in the southern channel of the Yangtze opposite the mouth of the Huangpu, the major river of central Shanghai. It is connected to Chongming by the Yangtze Bridge and Shanghai's Pudong New Area by the Yangtze Tunnel.

Hengsha Island lies to Changxing's east and is connected with the mainland and other islands by ferry service.

Pudong New Area

Jiuduansha is an intertidal wetland. The  area above sea level comprises four major shoals: Upper, Middle, Lower, and South Jiuduansha. The shoals began forming during the Yangtze floods of the late 1940s and early 1950s, but were developed and protected as a replacement for the wetlands of eastern Pudong during the construction of Shanghai's international airport in the 1990s. The cordgrass introduced in 1995 has succeeded in stabilizing the shoals but is now considered to be highly invasive, displacing the native reeds and bullrushes and degrading parts of the wetlands.

Jinshan District
Dajinshan Island (t , s , p Dàjīnshān Dǎo,  "Greater Gold Mountain Island"), Xiaojinshan Island ("Lesser Gold Mountain Island"), and Fushan Island in Jinshan District are nature reserves under city jurisdiction. They are located in Hangzhou Bay.

See also
 Islands of China

References

External links
 "Islands and Shoals of Shanghai" at the Office of Shanghai Chronicles 

 
Yangtze River Delta